The 1935 World Table Tennis Championships – Corbillon Cup (women's team) was the second edition of the women's team championship. 

Czechoslovakia won the gold medal beating Hungary in a play off final 3–1 after both teams finish with a 9–1 round robin match record.

Final table

Final

See also
List of World Table Tennis Championships medalists

References

-
1935 in women's table tennis